Parathylactus dorsalis is a species of beetle in the family Cerambycidae. It was described by Charles Joseph Gahan in 1890, originally under the genus Thylactus. It is known from Vietnam and Nepal.

References

Xylorhizini
Beetles described in 1890